Compsoctena barbarella is a moth in the family Eriocottidae. It was described by Francis Walker in 1856. It is found in India.

Adults are cinereous (ash-gray) fawn, the forewings with two oblique very incomplete and much interrupted bands formed by the speckles. The hindwings are cinereous.

References

Moths described in 1856
Compsoctena
Moths of Asia